Izhar Qazi (16 September 1955 – 23 December 2007) was a Pakistani actor and singer. His most famous films were Love In Nepal, Aalmi Jasoos, Khazana, and Sarkata Insaan. He was a two-time recipient of the Nigar Award. Most of his films were in Urdu and Punjabi. He was also a singer—he recorded a studio album, Zara Aake Dekho To, that was re-released by EMI Pakistan in 2014.

Career
Qazi was born in Khadda Market, Karachi. He began his professional career as an engineer at Pakistan Steel Mills. He was later introduced to television drama writer Fatima Suraiyya Bajia by his manager, Syed Abdul Munim. Bajia was looking for a new face for television, and Qazi's resemblance to Indian actor Amitabh Bachchan immediately caught her attention. She invited him to audition and he made his television debut in 1982, starring in the family television drama serial Ana. He appeared as the romantic lead alongside Mehreen Ilahi, Shakeel, and Ghazala Kaifee. He later appeared in the serials Daira and Gardish with Shakeel and Saqi.

After achieving television success, Qazi transitioned into the Lollywood film industry in 1986. His film debut as the lead role in Nazar Shabab's Ruby, alongside veteran co-stars Mustafa Qureshi, Shafi Mohammad, Sabeeta, and Rangeela. The film was met with critical acclaim. Qazi's role in the film was also notable because Jawed Shiekh had originally been cast for the lead role, but quit in order to travel to India with Salma Agha. Around the same time, Shiekh had also been cast in the film Bangkok Ke Chor. Director Jan Mohammad fired Shiekh and awarded the role to Qazi. Qazi's collaborations with Jan Muhammad included popular films including Manila ki bijlyan, Roop ki rani, and Choron ka baadshah. He also teamed up with Sultan Rahi in Punjabi-language films. 

Qazi retired from the film industry in 2003. His last acting role was in the series Pani Pe Naam, which aired on PTV.  He was dismayed by the poor quality of Lollywood films and local film industry politics. He then concentrated on his real estate business.

Personal life
Qazi had four daughters and a son. He was active in several literary organizations.

On 23 December 2007, he suffered a heart attack while singing at the wedding of his sister-in-law in Gulistan-e-Jauhar, Karachi. He later died at a local hospital. He was buried at Model Colony graveyard.

Awards and recognition 
Sarkata Insaan, in which Qazi played the role of a police investigator, won 8 Nigar Awards. Qazi was nominated for best actor at the 2004 Lux Style Awards. He also won the Graduate Award and Bolan Award. He was awarded Nigar Awards for his performances in Sakhi baadshan and Bakhtawar. He also received the National Award for best actor for his role in Masood Butt's Chiragh Bali.

Filmography

Films

Television
 Ana (Ego)
 Daira (Boundary)
 Gardish (Circulation)
 Zakham (Injury)
 Gunahgar (Sinner)
 Paani pe naam (Name on water)

Discography
Studio album
 Zara Aake Dekho To (EMI Pakistan, 2014)

See also 
 List of Lollywood actors

Notes

External links

The seen and unseen facets of Izhar Qazi
Sind governor condoles the death of Izhar Qazi

1955 births
2007 deaths
Pakistani male film actors
Nigar Award winners
Pakistani Muslims
Pakistani playback singers
People from Karachi
Male actors from Karachi
Muhajir people
Singers from Karachi
20th-century Pakistani male singers
Male actors in Punjabi cinema
Male actors in Urdu cinema